Anders Tyvand (born 14 May 1980) is a Norwegian politician for the Christian Democratic Party. He was elected to the Parliament of Norway from Vestfold in 2013 where he is member of the Standing Committee on Education, Research and Church Affairs.

References 

Christian Democratic Party (Norway) politicians
Members of the Storting
Vestfold politicians
1980 births
Living people
21st-century Norwegian politicians